R. Jayaram Padikkal was an IPS officer. He had served as the Director General of Police (DGP), the highest rank in the force in the period 1993–94.

Early years
Jayaram Padikkal I.P.S. was born in Peruvemba village Palghat in Kerala as the son of an Indian Army officer and had his education in Pune. He was said to be a good hockey player and a voracious reader, especially history, crime and philosophy and later joined the Indian Police Service.

In 1982 he was made the Deputy Inspector General of Police (DIG), for the state of Kerala and thus became the youngest DIG in the country. He was one of the few Indian Police officers to have received training at the Scotland Yard. He was a recipient of President's Police Medal.

Controversy 
When he was Deputy Inspector General (Crime Branch) of Kerala police, he and Pulikkodan Narayanan were accused of complicity in the torture and death of a student named Rajan at the hands of the police during the period of The Emergency. He was convicted but the conviction was overturned on appeal. He was known to maintain a good relationship with the then Kerala Chief minister K. Karunakaran.

In 1972, as District Superintendent of Police at Thrissur, Padikkal was involved in brutally assaulting Nawab Rajendran and destroying his press office. Its alleged that the attack was in retaliation to Nawab Rajendran's investigative journalism scoop against corruption done by then Home Minister K. Karunakaran in the land acquisition for setting up Kerala Agricultural University at Thrissur.

A book about his life and career, called The Crime Diary of Jayaram Padikkal, was written by Venganoor Balakrishnan in 1997. It describes him as "a NOTORIOUS and controversial IPS officer from Kerala, India." 
 He died in the same year, after falling ill. Before that, he was attacked by some militants on his way from Ernakulam Town railway station to his home nearby.

References

Popular Culture
In 2006 an experimental drama 'Ormakal Zindabad' (Memories longlive) staged in certain places in Kerala, directed by G.Ajayan based on the custodial death of Rajan. The parts of leading characters Jayaram Padikkal and Rajan were done by Salih Rawther and Shabu Madhavan respectively 

Indian police chiefs
Indian police officers
Kerala Police officers
People from Kerala
1936 births
1997 deaths